Kfar Tebnit or Kfar Tibnit       is a village located approximately  south southeast of Nabatieh,  southeast of Sidon in Lebanon.

Name
Kfar Tebnit takes its name from Tabnith, a Phoenician ruler in the area ca. 280 BC known as the "king of two Sidons". The sarcophagus of his son Eshmun-'azar was found to bear a long inscription aimed to prevent looting with assurances that the tomb contained no treasure.

Archaeology
A Heavy Neolithic archaeological site of the Qaraoun culture was discovered here in 1926 by E. Passemard. Heavy Neolithic materials were found alongside one Trihedral Neolithic along with more regular Neolithic pieces. The tools were in sharp condition, made of fresh chert or grey-green flint and are stored in the National Museum of Beirut.

History
In 1875  Victor Guérin visited, and found here 130 Metualis.

References

Bibliography

External links
Kfar Tibnit, Localiban

Populated places in Nabatieh District
Heavy Neolithic sites
Trihedral Neolithic sites
Neolithic settlements
Archaeological sites in Lebanon
Shia Muslim communities in Lebanon